Karimah Westbrook (born October 6, 1978) is an American actress, best known for her role as Grace James in The CW drama series, All American.

Life and career
Westbrook was born and raised in Chicago, Illinois. She attended the American Academy of Dramatic Arts and later began performing on screen and stage. She made her television debut in 2000, appearing in an episode of CBS medical drama City of Angels and later was cast in the teen dance drama film Save the Last Dance. Later she starred in the biographical drama film Baadasssss! opposite Mario Van Peebles. Westbrook also guest starred in a number of television shows, include Girlfriends, Mad Men and Shameless.

Westbrook has appeared in a number of independent films, include American Violet (2008) opposite Nicole Beharie and Alfre Woodard. She played supporting roles in films The Rum Diary (2011), Suburbicon (2017),  and After We Collided (2020). In 2018, she was cast as Grace James, the mother of the leading character in the CW drama series, All American.

Filmography

Film

TV

References

External links 
 

1978 births
Living people
Actresses from Chicago
American Academy of Dramatic Arts alumni
21st-century American actresses
American film actresses
American television actresses